Hampden, a small town in North Otago, New Zealand, lies close to the North Otago coast, 35 kilometres south of Oamaru and 80 kilometres north of the city of Dunedin, to both of which it is connected by State Highway 1.

The township's population at its largest was about 560, but by 2009 it had dwindled to approximately 230. Hampden is named in honour of the English politician John Hampden by early surveyor W. B. D. Mantell, possibly influenced by the location of a public house, The Hampden Hotel, at the site.

Geography
Hampden is situated beside a broad bay stretching from Aorere Point to Moeraki Point, on a coastal plain which rises westward to the foothills of the Horse Range and the Kakanui Range. The soil of this surrounding plain overlies a limestone formation. The Moeraki Boulders are located two kilometres south of Hampden. Much of the town lies between the Big Kuri (Kurinui) and Little Kuri Creeks.

The streets of Hampden run in a rectangular grid pattern centred on the main highway and the railway. They are named after English locations, such as Lancaster, Shrewsbury, Worcester, and Norfolk. There is surfing on the Katiki straight, as well as trout-fishing in the Waianakarua and Shag Rivers.

History
The settlement was founded in the 1860s, with the first sale of land sections dated to March 1863. By 1865, there were two public houses in the area, The Hampden Hotel and The Clyde Hotel, and both a cemetery and mechanics' institute were in place by 1870. early industry in the area included the harvesting of flax and timber.

A borough was proclaimed in 1879, with the first mayor being William Murcott. The borough existed until the 1960s, and Hampden is now part of the Waitaki District.

Demographics
It is part of the larger Waihemo statistical area.

Hampden had a population of 339 at the 2018 New Zealand census, an increase of 36 people (11.9%) since the 2013 census, and an increase of 42 people (14.1%) since the 2006 census. There were 156 households. There were 156 males and 177 females, giving a sex ratio of 0.88 males per female, with 48 people (14.2%) aged under 15 years, 30 (8.8%) aged 15 to 29, 168 (49.6%) aged 30 to 64, and 90 (26.5%) aged 65 or older.

Ethnicities were 86.7% European/Pākehā, 15.9% Māori, 1.8% Pacific peoples, and 2.7% Asian (totals add to more than 100% since people could identify with multiple ethnicities).

Although some people objected to giving their religion, 54.9% had no religion, 34.5% were Christian, 0.9% were Hindu and 1.8% had other religions.

Of those at least 15 years old, 30 (10.3%) people had a bachelor or higher degree, and 81 (27.8%) people had no formal qualifications. The employment status of those at least 15 was that 111 (38.1%) people were employed full-time, 48 (16.5%) were part-time, and 6 (2.1%) were unemployed.

Modern Hampden

The town includes a rural fire station, a fish-and-chip shop, a small supermarket, a motel, and backpackers, a popular camping ground, a cafe, mechanics workshop, a small second-hand goods shop, a tavern, and a historic town hall. Sheep farming is the primary economic activity of the region and is augmented by farming of other livestock.

The Hampden Energy Forum, established in 2007, has grown into a community self-help scheme that involves nearly everyone in the settlement, growing from a small group of enthusiasts who were concerned about the future of small rural communities in "post-oil" days. At the inaugural meeting to establish the Forum, more than one third of the town's population attended. The forum won the Trustpower Community Award in 2008.

Education 
Hampden School is a full primary school catering for years 1 to 8, with a roll of  students as of  The school opened in  1864.

Notable people 

 Helen Stephen Cowie (doctor)

References

External links
"Hampden," entry from the 1905 Cyclopedia of New Zealand.

Populated places in Otago
Waitaki District